The Shanghai Municipal Prison Administration is an agency of the Shanghai Municipal Bureau of Justice of Shanghai, China, a direct-controlled municipality.

Prisons

 Shanghai Women's Prison

References

External links
 Shanghai Municipal Prison Administration 

Politics of Shanghai
Provincial-level prison administrative bureaux in China